Trichromia androconiata is a moth of the family Erebidae first described by Walter Rothschild in 1909. It is found in French Guiana, Amazonas, Peru and Costa Rica.

References

androconiata
Moths described in 1909
Moths of South America
Fauna of South America